Kimongo is a district in the Niari Region of south-western Republic of the Congo. The capital lies at Kimongo.

Niari Department
Districts of the Republic of the Congo